The Portugueses legislatives election, 1856 was held on 9 November.

Parties
Históricos
Miguelistas
Regeneradores

Results

Notes and references

Legislative elections in Portugal
1856 elections in Europe
1856 in Portugal
November 1856 events